This page is an overview of the results of Sweden at the World Single Distances Speed Skating Championships.

List of medalists

Medal table

Medals by discipline

Medals by championships

World Speed Skating Championships